Piotr Polk (born 22 January 1962 in Kalety) is a Polish actor and singer. He portrayed Leo Rosner in the 1993 American film Schindler's List. He appeared in the comedy television series Bao-Bab, czyli zielono mi in 2003. He portrayed Paul Sheldon in a 2017 stage version of Misery.

Discography

Studio albums

Music videos

References

External link

Polish male actors
Polish film actors
Polish television actors
Polish male stage actors
Actors from Łódź
1962 births
Living people
Polish pop singers
21st-century Polish male singers
21st-century Polish singers
Łódź Film School alumni
People from Tarnowskie Góry County